Louis Robert Paul Ducruet (born 26 November 1992) is the son of Princess Stéphanie of Monaco and Daniel Ducruet.

Early life
Ducruet grew up in Monaco-Ville. His parents, Princess Stéphanie of Monaco and Daniel Ducruet, were married in 1995, but divorced a year later. For a couple of years, he lived in Auron, France, then he moved with his mother and sisters to the Zurich area. After 2002, he and his mother and sisters returned to live in Monaco.

Ducruet attended primary school in Auron.  He then attended the Lycée français Marie Curie de Zurich. He completed secondary schooling at Lycée Albert Premier, where he passed the Baccalauréat in 2010. He started his post-secondary education at Skema Business School in Sophia Antipolis, France. In 2015, he graduated with a bachelor's degree in Sports Management at Western Carolina University, in Cullowhee, North Carolina

Career and interests
Immediately after secondary school, he took a summer job in the water sports department of Société des bains de mer de Monaco (SBM). He interned for AS Monaco FC and, after obtaining his degree, took a salaried position as an international recruiter. Early in 2019, he was promoted to Assistant to the Vice-President of the club, Vadim Vasilyev.

As of March 2016, Ducruet and his father, Daniel Ducruet, are co-managers of the Monaco-based company MONADECO.

In 2013, Ducruet participated in the "4L Trophy" automobile race. The race covered 6000 km, with starting points from Poitiers to Saint-Jean-de-Luz, and tracked over France, Spain, and Morocco. Ducruet and his co-driver, Ronan Imbrosciano, drove a car that was decorated in the colors and emblem of Radio Monaco. The money raised from the event provides school supplies to poor Moroccan students.

On 26 October 2020, it was announced that Ducruet joined EFL Championship football club Nottingham Forest as an advisor for international projects.

Marriage and children
On 12 February 2018, Ducruet announced his engagement to long-time girlfriend, Marie Hoa Chevallier (born 28 December 1992), a Frenchwoman of Vietnamese descent. Ducruet and Chevallier met in their first year of Grande école at the Skema Business School. Chevallier is a graduate of Skema, where she earned her Bachelor of Business Administration, and is specialized in French Education and Marketing from Western Carolina University. She has a career as event coordinator in luxury hospitality.

The civil wedding took place on 26 July 2019 at Monaco town hall. The religious wedding took place on 27 July 2019 at Cathedral of Our Lady Immaculate.

They are expecting their first child, a baby girl.

References

External links
 Photos of Louis next to his mother, Princess Stéphanie and uncle Prince Albert II (February 2012)

House of Grimaldi
Monegasque Roman Catholics
Monegasque people of Irish descent
Monegasque people of American descent
Kelly family
1992 births
Living people
Monegasque people of Scottish descent
Monegasque people of Italian descent
Monegasque people of German descent
Monegasque people of Mexican descent
Monegasque people of English descent
Western Carolina University alumni